Tsentralnyi District is an administrative raion (district) of the city of Simferopol. Population:

See also
Simferopol Municipality

References

Urban districts of Simferopol
Simferopol Municipality